The 1997 Tour de France was the 84th edition of the Tour de France and took place from 5 to 27 July. Jan Ullrich's victory margin of 9:09 was the largest margin of victory since Laurent Fignon won the 1984 Tour de France by 10:32. Since 1997 no rider has had this convincing of a win with the closest margin to Ullrich's victory being Vincenzo Nibali winning the 2014 Tour de France with a gap of 7:39. Ullrich's simultaneous victories in both the general classification  and the young riders' classification marked the first time the same rider had won both categories in the same Tour since Laurent Fignon in 1983. The points classification was won by Ullrich's teammate Erik Zabel, for the second time, and their team  also won the team classification. The mountains classification was won by Richard Virenque for the fourth time.

Teams

198 riders in 22 teams commenced the 1997 Tour de France. 139 riders finished. The 16 teams with the highest UCI ranking at the start of 1997 were automatically qualified. Six wildcard invitations were also given.

The teams entering the race were:

Qualified teams

Invited teams

Route and stages

Race overview

The Prologue was won by Time Trial Specialist Chris Boardman giving him the Yellow Jersey for stage one with Ullrich just two seconds behind. Defending champion Bjarne Riis, who had been preparing for and seeking a repeat victory with Ullrich acting as his Super-Domestique finished outside the top 10 but was in no way concerned as he had come into the Tour in good form. The first four stages were flat stages, the first two of which were won by the infamous Italian sprinter Mario Cipollini with the third going to Erik Zabel and the fourth being won by Nicola Minali. Cipollini would wear the Yellow Jersey following the first few stages due to bonus seconds during the sprint finishes. During the 261 km stage five from Chantonnay to Le Chatre Cédric Vasseur survived a breakaway and finished nearly two and a half minutes ahead of the Peloton to claim the stage win and the Yellow Jersey, which he would hold on to until the race reached the high mountains.

Stage 6 was won by Jeroen Blijlevens in a sprint finish with Djamolidine Abdoujaparov finishing 2nd which would be his highest placing in this final TDF of his impressive career. Stages 7 and 8 followed rounding out the first week with sprint finishes, both of which were won by Erik Zabel as he bested Jaan Kirsipuu and Blijlevens in stage 7 and Minali and Blijlevens in stage 8. Zabel had donned the Green Jersey following stage 3 and would hold it all the way to Paris. Stage 9 was the first stage in the Pyrenees which included the Col d'Aspin and Col du Tourmalet as two of the five categorized climbs. Laurent Brochard won the stage with the elite group of Richard Virenque, Pantani and Ullrich finishing 0:14 behind. Surprisingly to some defending champion Riis lost nearly thirty seconds to the other contenders coming across in 8th putting him in a tie for 4th in the overall standings with Virenque at 1:43 behind Vasseur after the first major mountain stage. Spaniard Abraham Olano was in 3rd at 1:14 behind and the next closest GC favorite was Ullrich 0:14 behind him.

Stage 10 was another high mountain stage with five climbs and was won convincingly by Ullrich by 1:06 over Virenque and Pantani as Riis and Olano each lost more than three minutes. With the victory Ullrich became the first German rider to wear the maillot jaune since Klaus-Peter Thaler in the 1978 Tour de France and only  3rd overall as "Didi" Dietrich Thurau wore it for 15 days in the 1977 Tour de France. Stage 11 was an intermediate stage in which Laurent Desbiens survived to finish 0:18 ahead of the bunch together with two other riders whom he outsprinted to take the stage win. There were no major attacks by the GC riders in this stage so going into the ITT in Stage 12 Ullrich was convincingly in the lead at 2:38 over Virenque, 4:46 over Olano and 4:53 over his teammate Riis, who at this point remained confident he was still the leader of Team Telekom with Ullrich continuing to ride for him as a Super-Domestique.

The individual time trial extinguished any and all doubts who was in command of the race as Ullrich put more than three minutes into all of his competitors and teammates with 2nd place Virenque now approaching a six-minute deficit in the overall standings and Pantani, Olano and Riis each being eight minutes or more behind.

Stage 13 was Alpe d'Huez and the only rider able to drop Ullrich was Pantani who had to put in one of the fastest recorded times up Alpe d'Huez in TDF history in order to do so. Virenque finished 3rd 1:27 behind Pantani and Francesco Casagrande finished 4th on the stage while also moving to 6th place in the overall standings. Riis finished 5th, losing nearly another two minutes to Ullrich. In stage 14 Virenque made an attack to win back time on Ullrich, helped by his entire team. The margin was never more than two minutes, and Ullrich was able to get back to Virenque before the final climb. Virenque won the stage, but Ullrich finished in the same time.
In stage 15 it was the Pirate attacking and winning his second stage and while he remained more than ten minutes behind Ullrich he did jump Riis in the standings to move in the final podium position.

Ullrich remained fully in command as the race progressed and aside from suffering a major crash or failing a doping control there wasn't much chance of him losing the Tour. Stage 18 was the final mountain stage and included a rare climb up the Ballon d'Alsace, which was a popular stage early in TDF history but hadn't been included since the 1982 Tour de France and was added to the route for only the 4th time since World War II. Frenchman Didier Rous would win the stage beating the next closest breakaway riders in Pascal Hervé, Bobby Julich and Laurent Roux by more than five minutes to finish the mountain stages with there being no further changes among the general classification favorites.

The final ITT in Stage 20 was won by Olano with Ullrich taking second 0:45 back. The final stage on the Champs-Élysées was won by Nicola Minali who beat out Zabel, Blijlevens, Henk Vogel, Robbie McEwen and George Hincapie in the mass sprint finish. Afterwards on the podiums Erik Zabel was awarded the green jersey, Richard Virenque won the King of the Mountains as well as the Most Combative Rider, in 3rd place on the podium was Marco Pantani, in 2nd was Virenque and in 1st overall winning the best young rider award, as well as the yellow jersey as champion of the Tour de France was Jan Ullrich.

Classification leadership and minor prizes

There were several classifications in the 1997 Tour de France. The most important was the general classification, calculated by adding each cyclist's finishing times on each stage. The cyclist with the least accumulated time was the race leader, identified by the yellow jersey; the winner of this classification is considered the winner of the Tour.

Additionally, there was a points classification, which awarded a green jersey. In the points classification, cyclists got points for finishing among the best in a stage finish, or in intermediate sprints. The cyclist with the most points lead the classification, and was identified with a green jersey.

There was also a mountains classification. The organisation had categorised some climbs as either hors catégorie, first, second, third, or fourth-category; points for this classification were won by the first cyclists that reached the top of these climbs first, with more points available for the higher-categorised climbs. The cyclist with the most points lead the classification, and wore a white jersey with red polka dots.

The fourth individual classification was the young rider classification, which was not marked by a jersey. This was decided the same way as the general classification, but only riders under 26 years were eligible.

For the team classification, the times of the best three cyclists per team on each stage were added; the leading team was the team with the lowest total time.

In addition, there was a combativity award given after each mass-start stage to the cyclist considered most combative. The decision was made by a jury composed of journalists who gave points. The cyclist with the most points from votes in all stages led the combativity classification. Richard Virenque won this classification, and was given overall the super-combativity award. The Souvenir Henri Desgrange was given in honour of Tour founder Henri Desgrange to the first rider to pass the summit of the Port d'Envalira on stage 10. This prize was won by Virenque for the third time, the most by any rider in Tour history.

In stage 1, Jan Ullrich wore the green jersey.
In stage 2, Tom Steels wore the green jersey.
In stage 3, Erik Zabel wore the green jersey.

Final standings

General classification

Points classification

Mountains classification

Young rider classification

Team classification

Combativity classification

Aftermath
After Ullrich's domination of the 1997 Tour de France at his young age, it was believed that Ullrich would dominate the Tour de France for the next years. However, Ullrich would never win the Tour again, although he did reach the podium four more times finishing second to Pantani in 1998 and standing 2nd on the podium to Lance Armstrong three times. He also reached the podium in the 2005 Tour de France, but that result was later voided. Ullrich would win another Grand Tour however, the 1999 Vuelta a España.

Notes

References

Bibliography

External links

 
 1997 Tour de France at Cyclingnews.com

 
Tour de France
Tour
Tour de France by year
Tour de France